Palaina embra, also known as the mountain-top staircase snail, is a species of staircase snail that is endemic to Australia's Lord Howe Island in the Tasman Sea.

Description
The pupiform shell of adult snails is 3 mm in height, with a diameter of 1.8 mm. It is white in colour, with golden-brown apical whorls and impressed sutures. It has strong, widely spaced, axal ribs. The umbilicus is closed. The circular aperture has a weakly reflected lip and an operculum is present.

Habitat
The snail is most common in the southern mountains of the island.

References

 
embra
Gastropods of Lord Howe Island
Taxa named by Tom Iredale
Gastropods described in 1944